The Casanna is a mountain of the Plessur Alps, overlooking Serneus and Klosters in the canton of Graubünden. It lies west of the Gotschnagrat, where a cable car station is located.

References

External links
 Casanna on Hikr

Mountains of the Alps
Mountains of Switzerland
Mountains of Graubünden
Two-thousanders of Switzerland